The Pestel amphisbaena (Amphisbaena leali) is a species of worm lizard in the family Amphisbaenidae. The species is endemic to Haiti.

Etymology
The specific name, leali, is in honor of herpetologist Manuel Leal, co-collector of the holotype.

Reproduction
A. leali is oviparous.

References

Further reading
Thomas R, Hedges SB (2006). "Two New Species of Amphisbaena (Reptilia: Squamata: Amphisbaenidae) from the Tiburon Peninsula of Haiti". Caribbean Journal of Science 42 (2): 208–219. (Amphisbaena leali, new species, pp. 213–215, Figure 5).

Amphisbaena (lizard)
Reptiles described in 2006
Taxa named by Richard Thomas (herpetologist)
Taxa named by Stephen Blair Hedges
Endemic fauna of Haiti
Reptiles of Haiti